Thomas or Tom Farrell may refer to:

Thomas Farrell (general) (1891–1967), Deputy Commanding General of the Manhattan Project
Tom Farrell (hurdler) (born 1932), British hurdler and middle-distance runner
Tom Farrell (middle-distance runner) (born 1944), American middle-distance runner
Tom Farrell (long-distance runner) (born 1991), British long-distance runner
Tom Farrell (rugby union) (born 1993), Irish rugby union player
Tom Farrell (Gimme Gimme Gimme), a fictional character in Gimme Gimme Gimme
Tommy Farrell (1921–2004), American actor
Tommy Farrell (footballer, born 1937) (1937–2012), former Irish football player
Tommy Farrell (footballer, born 1887) (1887–1916), English footballer
Thomas Richard Farrell (1926–1958), New Zealand pianist
Thomas Joseph Farrell (1847–1913), Member of Parliament for South Kerry 1895–1900
Thomas Farrell (sculptor) (1827–1900), Irish sculptor
Tom Farrell (Canadian politician) (1924–2012)
Thomas J. Farrell (medievalist), American medievalist
F. Thomas Farrell (born 1941), American mathematician

See also
O'Farrell, surname